Lauretta M Schimmoler (September 17, 1900 Fort Jennings, Ohio -  January 1981 Glendale, California) was an aviator who was the first woman in the United States to establish an airport in the United States, the first woman to command an American Legion post and was the founder of the Aerial Nurse Corps of America the predecessor of the flight nurses of the United States Air Force.

Biography

Schimmoler graduated from the Bliss Business College in Columbus, Ohio and began studies in law after working as a court stenographer. She left the study of law to become a secretary in a chicken hatchery in Bucyrus, Ohio that led her to become the owner of her own poultry business.

Her life changed when she witnessed a test flight in Dayton. She began an intensive study of flight through working various jobs with the United States Air Mail, Lockheed Aircraft where she studied the manufacture of aircraft and the US Weather Bureau earning a student pilot licence on August 10, 1929, and becoming the advertising manager of her flight school. She became the first woman to establish and maintain an airport that was located in Bucyrus. She received her full pilot's licence on September 8, 1930.

In 1932 in recognition of her works in aviation, she was inducted into the Ninety-Nines: International Organization of Women Pilots.

After witnessing the results of a tornado in Ohio in 1930, Schimmoler saw the necessity of evacuating medical patients by air and created what today is recognised as the forerunners of the flight nurse.  In 1933 she formed the Emergency Flight Corps. In 1936 it was reformed as the Aerial Nurse Corps with 78 nurses.

Initially, both the American Red Cross and the United States Army Air Forces took a dim view of the Aerial Nurse Corps. However, during World War II a medical air ambulance evacuation squadron was formed in May 1942.  During this time Shimmoler became the technical advisor to and played a role in the Columbia Pictures film Parachute Nurse that was released in August 1942.

The United States Army Air Forces changed their minds on flight nurses and on 30 November 1942 made an appeal for experienced female registered nurses and air hostesses to be flight nurses in the Army Nurse Corps to be assigned to air evacuation units.

In 1944 she, at last, was commissioned in the Women's Army Corps.

Schimmoler became the first post commander of the American Legion's Amelia Earhardt Post 127 of Glendale, California in 1946 that initially contained woman veterans.

In 1966 Schimmoler was recognised by the Surgeon General of the United States as the first flight nurse and by the  United States Air Force who awarded her the gold wings of a flight nurse.

Legacy
In 2011 the United States Air Force Association created a Schimmoler Award for excellence.

Notes

1900 births
1981 deaths
American women aviators
American women in World War II
Aviation pioneers
Aviators from Ohio
United States Army officers
Women in the United States Army
20th-century American people